Piendamó is a municipality in the department of Cauca in southwestern Colombia.

History
The town of Piendamó was founded by Pedro Antonio Sandoval on April 2, 1525.

Piendamó was formerly called Tunía and as such an encomienda of the conquistadors Sebastian de Belalcázar, Francisco Arévalo, Pedro Matta and Pedro de Velasco. 

In 1917, the construction of the railway line that would link the city of Cali with the city of Popayán began, approving the layout for the site where Piendamó is today. At the beginning of 1924 the first locomotives arrived in this town and with them a large number of merchants, immigrants and settlers from the department of Valle del Cauca and the coffee region.

Description 
It borders Silvia in the east, Morales in the west, Caldono in the north and Cajibio in the south.

Named after Piendamó 
 Piendamó River
 Piendamó Fault

References 

Municipalities of Cauca Department
Populated places established in 1525